The 2017–18 Alpe Adria Cup, also known as Helios Alpe Adria Cup by sponsorship reasons, was the third edition of Alpe Adria Cup. It started on 15 September 2017 and ended 3 April 2018.

Format
Sixteen teams from six countries joined the competition and were divided into four groups of four teams, where the top two teams from each group will qualify for the quarterfinals.

Before the draw, Croatian club Zabok withdrew from the competition. It was replaced by Czech mmcité Brno.

Regular season

Group A

Group B

Group C

Group D

Playoffs

References

External links
Official website
Alpe Adria Cup at Eurobasket.com

2017–18
2017–18 in European basketball leagues
2017–18 in Croatian basketball
2017–18 in Slovenian basketball
2017–18 in Slovak basketball
2017–18 in Austrian basketball
2017–18 in Czech basketball